The cabinet of Take Ionescu was the government of Romania from 17 December 1921 to 19 January 1922.

Ministers
The ministers of the cabinet were as follows:

President of the Council of Ministers:
Take Ionescu (17 December 1921 - 19 January 1922)
Minister of the Interior: 
Ion Cămărășescu (17 December 1921 - 19 January 1922)
Minister of Foreign Affairs: 
Gheorghe Derussi (17 December 1921 - 19 January 1922)
Minister of Finance:
Take Ionescu (17 December 1921 - 19 January 1922)
Minister of Justice:
Stelian Popescu (17 December 1921 - 19 January 1922)
Minister of War:
Gen. Ștefan Holban (17 December 1921 - 19 January 1922)
Minister of Public Works:
Gheorghe Lucasievici (17 December 1921 - 19 January 1922)
Minister of Communications:
Constantin Cihodariu (17 December 1921 - 19 January 1922)
Minister of Industry and Commerce:
Mihail Oromolu (17 December 1921 - 2 January 1922)
(interim) Gheorghe Lucasievici (2 - 19 January 1922)
Minister of Public Instruction:
George G. Mironescu (17 December 1921 - 19 January 1922)
Minister of Religious Affairs and the Arts:
Vasile Dumitrescu-Brăila (17 December 1921 - 19 January 1922)
Minister of Agriculture:
Dumitru Dumitrescu (17 December 1921 - 19 January 1922)
Minister of Property:
Mihail Vlădescu (17 December 1921 - 19 January 1922)
Minister of Labour and Social Security:
Constantin Xeni (17 December 1921 - 19 January 1922)

Minister of State (without portfolio):
Dimitrie Bogos (5 - 19 December 1922)

References

Cabinets of Romania
Cabinets established in 1921
Cabinets disestablished in 1922
1921 establishments in Romania
1922 disestablishments in Romania